Jack Theodore Litman (July 26, 1943 – January 23, 2010) was a criminal defense lawyer most famous for his "blame the victim" defense of Robert Chambers, Jr. (the "Preppy Killer"). 

The son of a Jewish Belgian haberdasher and his wife, who together fled Europe the day before the Nazi invasion of Belgium, Litman was born in New York City. He attended Stuyvesant High School and Cornell University before enrolling in Harvard Law School, from which he graduated in 1967. 

After a Fulbright scholarship in France, he joined the Manhattan District Attorney's office under the leadership of Frank Hogan. He left the DA's office as deputy chief of the homicide bureau, and became a defense attorney.

While intellectual and cool in the courtroom, he adopted the strategy of soliciting juries' sympathies for the perpetrators of even the most horrible murders. The tactics used in the Preppy Killer trial earned him scathing criticisms from many quarters, including victims' rights advocates, feminists, and the family of the victim. But he also won praise for his zealous advocacy, which he considered to be among society's most noble pursuits. 

He held many positions of authority in the criminal-defense bar, including as a founder and president of the New York State Association of Criminal Defense Attorneys (NYSACDL), which honored him with a Lifetime Achievement Award, and as a member of the Board of Directors of the National Association of Criminal Defense Lawyers (NACDL), which honored him with a resolution praising his "extraordinary legal ability, dedication, compassion and commitment to representation of the accused" shortly after his passing.

Litman had two sons, who survived him. He died at age 66 in January, 2010, of lymphoma, a disease he had suffered for more than ten years.

References

1943 births
2010 deaths
Stuyvesant High School alumni
Cornell University alumni
Harvard Law School alumni